Doukouyo is a town in south-central Ivory Coast. It is a sub-prefecture of Gagnoa Department in Gôh Region, Gôh-Djiboua District.

Doukouyo was a commune until March 2012, when it became one of 1126 communes nationwide that were abolished.

In 2014, the population of the sub-prefecture of Doukouyo was 21,36121,361.

Villages

The 5 villages of the sub-prefecture of Doukouyo and their population in 2014 are :

 Guéyo-Bamo  (3 024)
 Oupohio  (953)
 Bamo 1  (10 188)
 Daliguépalégnoa  (3 746)
 Doukouyo  (3 450)

References

Sub-prefectures of Gôh
Former communes of Ivory Coast